Pediasia gregori is a moth in the family Crambidae. It was described by Roesler in 1975. It is found in Mongolia.

References

Crambini
Moths described in 1975
Moths of Asia